Pettywell is a hamlet within the a civil parish of Reepham in the English county of Norfolk. The hamlet is on the north side of the B1145  which links King's Lynn and Mundesley. The nearest railway station is at North Walsham for the Bittern Line which runs between Sheringham, Cromer and Norwich.The nearest airport is at Norwich International Airport. For the purposes of local government, the parish of Reepham falls within the district of Broadland.

Description
The hamlet of Pettywell consists of a collection of cottages around the former farmhouse now known as Pettywell Place. Most of the farm buildings have now been converted to residential properties.

References

Hamlets in Norfolk
Reepham, Norfolk